G H Raisoni College of Engineering (GHRCE) is an autonomous engineering college affiliated to Rashtrasant Tukadoji Maharaj Nagpur University and is located in Nagpur. The college was established in 1996 and Run by Ankush Shikshan Sanstha.

History
GHRCE was established in 1996 and is run by Ankush Shikshan Sanstha. Sunil Raisoni presides over the trust. All undergraduate courses are permanently affiliated by Rashtrasant Tukadoji Maharaj Nagpur University. In 2010, the institute was granted autonomy by the University Grants Commission. GHRCE is the youngest institute in the country to qualify for and implement the Technical Education Quality Improvement Fund (TEQIP) Project.

Fests
Antaragni (Hindi: अंतराग्नि; English: The Fire Within) is the annual cultural festival of GHRCE. It is held in January or February.

Technorion is an intercollegiate technical event that hosts technical events, technical workshops, Robowar, Line-Following competition, and Lan Gaming.

IPR and patents
The Indian Patent Office's annual reports ranks GHRCE in overall patent filing:

Choice Based Credit System
GHRCE is an institute in the country to implement a Choice Based Credit System in engineering education.

IEEE
The IEEE Student Branch (STB62361) was founded in December 1999 and is one of the largest student branches in region-10 in terms of IEEE students membership. The student's branch at GHRCE was awarded the Best IEEE students Branch Award by IEEE India Council in 2017.

The Mu Pi Chapter  was inaugurated on 25 April 2018 by Dr. Ramkrishna Kappagantu. It is the third HKN Chapter in India. IEEE-Eta Kappa Nu (IEEE-HKN) is the honour society of IEEE.

Conferences
The institute hosted fifteen international conferences, including nine IEEE International Conferences, one Elsevier International conference, and over 30 National conferences. In 2008, GHRCE started a series of IEEE conferences — International Conference on Emerging Trends in Engineering & Technology (ICETET).

Rankings

The National Institutional Ranking Framework (NIRF) ranked it 130 among engineering colleges in 2021.

GHRCE ranked 69 in the engineering category in the survey "The Best Colleges of India" conducted by India Today-MDRA for 2018.

It was ranked among the Top 10 Best Industry Linked Institutes by the AICTE-CII Survey Report of 2013

It was ranked under the Platinum category for Best Industry linked institution by AICTE-CII Surveys of 2015, 2016, 2017, and 2018.

GHRCE has been accredited with "A" Grade in 2012 and re-accredited with "A+" grade in 2017 by NAAC.

Currently, all seven undergraduate programs are NBA accredited under Tier-I (Washington Accord).

Notable alumni
 Lopa Mudra Raut
 Shiv Thakare

References

External links 
 

Engineering colleges in Maharashtra
Rashtrasant Tukadoji Maharaj Nagpur University
Engineering colleges in Nagpur